L'Anse Amour is a small village on the Strait of Belle Isle in Labrador, a part of the Canadian province of Newfoundland and Labrador. As of 2006, it had a population of 8 (1996), down from a total of 14 returned five years earlier.  The settlement has not been returned separately since, though the 'between communities' population of Subdivision 10A has grown in the intervening years to a total of 20 by 2016 (up from 10 in 2011), of which L'Anse Amour may reasonably be assumed to contain much of it. L'Anse Amour is located along Route 510 (Trans-Labrador Highway).

Demographics
The figures below pertain to Division No. 10, Subd. A, which includes L'Anse Amour. 
 Population, 2001: 64
 Population, 1996: 83
 Population change, 1996-2001: -22.9 percent
 Area (square kilometers): 3,755.19
 Number of families: 25
No statistics for the town of L'Anse Amour itself are available, though a tourist Web site lists the town's population at 8.

History

Literally translated from French as "The Love Cove," L'Anse Amour is a corruption of an earlier name, L'Anse aux Morts, which means "The Cove of the Dead."

Human settlement in the area dates back at least 7,500 years as evidenced by the burial mound of a Maritime Archaic boy here. His body was wrapped in a shroud of bark or hide and placed face down with his head pointed to the west. A sign at the site describes the significance of the burial mound and reproductions of artifacts found there are located at the Labrador Straits Museum in L'Anse au Loup, Labrador.

The burial mound site was designated a National Historic Site of Canada in 1978.

Icebergs and a narrow passage make the Strait of Belle Isle a hazardous body of water. However, the route provided a shortcut between the United Kingdom and larger ports such as Montreal, Quebec.

The wreck of one of the ships to go aground in the passage, HMS Raleigh, is located near Point Amour. A trail along the shore allows visitors to see the rusting remains of the ship, which went aground on August 8, 1922 and was demolished by explosives in 1926.

Attractions
L'Anse Amour was nominated in a 2007 CBC Seven Wonders of Canada competition. The nomination cited the very small friendly population of the community and many attractions of the area.

The tallest lighthouse in Atlantic Canada is located at nearby Point Amour. A Maritime Archaic mound burial dating to 7500 years ago, L' Anse Amour Burial National Historic Site, is also located nearby.

See also
 List of communities in Newfoundland and Labrador

References

External links
A description of L'Anse Amour
L'Anse Amour Burial National Historic Site
Statistics Canada

Populated coastal places in Canada
Populated places in Labrador